Isaac Motte (December 8, 1738 – May 8, 1795) was an American soldier and statesman from Charleston, South Carolina. He served as a colonel in the Revolutionary War and represented South Carolina in the Continental Congress from 1780 to 1782.

References

External links

Biographic shetch at U.S. Congress website

1738 births
1795 deaths
Continental Congressmen from South Carolina
18th-century American politicians